C. elegantula may refer to:
 Calligrapha elegantula, a species of leaf beetles found in Costa Rica
 Chartoscirta elegantula, a Palearctic shore bug (Saldidae) widespread in marshes or at the margins of rivers and lakes